Guadalupe is a municipality in the San Vicente department of El Salvador.

Guadalupe is a small town.

Guadalupe has one Catholic church, one high school (secundaria), one elementary school (primaria), one clinic only open on certain days of the week.

Municipalities of the San Vicente Department